Samuel A. Countee (April 1, 1909–September 11, 1959) was a painter and sculptor. SSG Samuel A. Countee Hall at Fort Leonard Wood is named in his honor.

Early life and education 
Countee was born in Marshall, Texas to Thomas Countee and Nannie Salina Yates Countee. He attended Booker T. Washington High School from 1924 to 1928. 

Countee graduated in 1934 with a degree in art from Bishop College. While in college, he painted portraits of faculty and administrators to raise money for tuition. 

Countee graduated from college in 1934 after which he earned a scholarship to the Boston Museum of Arts where he served as an artist-in-residence.

Career 

Countee's work depicted African-American life.  

From 1933-1935, Countee exhibited his art in a number of shows. In 1933, his piece, Little Brown Boy, was exhibited by the William E. Harmon Foundation. He also exhibited at Howard University, Atlanta University, Smith College, Institute of Modern Art in Boston, and the 1936 Texas Centennial's Hall of Negro Life.

Countee was drafted into the United States Army in 1942 where he served in the 436th Engineer General Service Dump Truck Company. While in the Army, he was commissioned to create a mural for the African-American Officers’ Club at Fort Leonard Wood in Missouri. He also painted sets for USO shows.

Countee moved to New York after being discharged from the military. He became known among New York artists and went on to paint portraits of Lucille Armstrong, Harry Belafonte, and Marian Anderson.

Personal life 
Countee settled in Long Island, New York. He married Mary Miner in 1955.

Countee died of cancer on September 11, 1959.

Legacy 
In 2019, the Fort Leonard Wood African-American Officers’ Club that houses Countee's mural was renamed SSG Samuel A. Countee Hall.

Countee's niece, Sammie Witing-Ellis, helped to attribute the mural to her uncle after finding matching work in his sketchbook.

References 

1909 births
1959 deaths
African-American artists
Artists from Texas
Artists from New York City
Artists from New York (state)

External link 
Mural, SSG Samuel A. Countee Hall, Fort Leanord Wood